The Teuz is a left tributary of the river Crișul Negru in Romania. It discharges into the Crișul Negru in Tămașda.

Tributaries

The following rivers are tributaries to the Teuz:

Left: Iacoberi, Fuleri
Right: Valea Nouă, Gropoi, Groșeni, Beliu, Sartiș, Renișel, Frunziș

References

Rivers of Romania
Rivers of Arad County
Rivers of Bihor County